Legrena is a coastal village in East Attica in southern Greece on the coast of the Attica peninsula. It is part of the municipality Lavreotiki. It lies along Greek National Road 91, to the west of Sounion. It contains an extensive beach and bay of the same name. The European Public Law Center is located in the vicinity.

References

External links
Handgliding video over the beach at Legrena

Populated coastal places in Greece
Populated places in East Attica